Casino Sociedad Deportiva Arzúa is a Spanish football team located in Arzúa, province of A Coruña, autonomous community of Galicia. Founded in 1967 it currently plays in Tercera División RFEF – Group 1, holding home matches at Municipal O Viso with a capacity of 2,000 spectators.

History 
The club was founded in August 1967. CSD Arzúa's first promotion to the Tercera División was in May 2019.

Season to season

3 seasons in Tercera División
1 season in Tercera División RFEF

References

External links
 

Football clubs in Galicia (Spain)
Association football clubs established in 1967
1967 establishments in Spain